Paracontias manify is a species of skinks. It is endemic to Madagascar.

References

Paracontias
Reptiles described in 2002
Taxa named by Franco Andreone
Taxa named by Allen Eddy Greer
Reptiles of Madagascar